Neil Crawford (born 26 November 1958) is an English cricketer. He played 22 first-class matches for Cambridge University Cricket Club between 1978 and 1980.

See also
 List of Cambridge University Cricket Club players

References

External links
 

1958 births
Living people
English cricketers
Cambridge University cricketers
Cricketers from Leeds